CCL Industries Inc.  is a Toronto, Ontario-based company founded in 1951.  It describes itself as the world's largest label maker.  It is listed on the Toronto Stock Exchange, and is an S&P/TSX 60 Component.  CCL consists of five divisions – CCL Label, CCL Container, Avery, Checkpoint, and Innovia.  It has 154 manufacturing facilities in North America, Latin America, Europe, Asia, Australia and Africa operated by approximately 20,000 employees.

History 
CCL was founded in 1951 as Connecticut Chemicals (Canada) Limited.  In 1979, the name was changed to CCL Industries.  It originally focused on custom manufacturing for the Canadian consumer products industry.    Starting in the 1980s, it expanded into labels and other packaging, and also expanded internationally into the United States and the United Kingdom.  It went public on the Toronto Stock Exchange in 1980. In the 2000s, it started shifting away from custom manufacturing and towards labels and packaging; in 2005, it sold its custom manufacturing business to KCP Income Fund for $256 million.  In 2006, it sold its interest in ColepCCP, a European custom manufacturing joint venture with Portuguese company RAR, for $140 million.  In 2013, it acquired Avery for $500 million from Avery Dennison, its biggest acquisition to that time.  In 2015, it bought Worldmark, a British labelling company specializing in labels for the technology sector, for $255 million.  In 2016, it acquired Checkpoint Systems for $422 million.  In December 2016, CCL acquired Innovia Films Ltd, a British specialty films company, for $1.13 billion Canadian Dollars.  In 2017, it joined the S&P/TSX 60.

Business 
CCL provides labels and packaging products to various markets, including consumer product, healthcare, and industrial companies.  Specific markets served include the home product, personal care, food & beverage, pharmaceutical, apparel, industrial chemical, automotive, and electronics markets.  As of 2016, 5% of sales were in Canada, 46% were in the United States, 7% were in Latin America, 28% were in Europe, and the other 14% were in Asia-Pacific and Africa.

Divisions

CCL Label
CCL's Label business is its largest business segment; contributing approximately 63% to CCL's total sales as of 2016. The Label Division provides package decorating solutions and specialty label applications for global customers. CCL Label is one of the world's largest converters of pressure-sensitive and film materials. The company produces a wide range of labelling products including expanded content, 2-ply, WashOff, Shrink Sleeves, RFID and promotional pieces.

CCL Container
Container business contributes approximately 6% to CCL's total sales and is a manufacturer of aluminum cans and beverage bottles in North America.

Avery
Contributing approximately 20% to CCL's total sales, Avery was acquired from Avery Dennison in 2013 and supplies media for use in Digital printers.

Checkpoint Systems
Acquired in 2016, Checkpoint contributes approximately 11% of CCL's total sales.  It provides loss-prevention and inventory management labelling for clothing retailers.

Innovia Films Ltd
Acquired in December 2016, Innovia manufactures specialty films for packaging, labelling, graphic arts and industrial products.

References

External links
 
 Toronto Stock Exchange: 

Companies listed on the Toronto Stock Exchange
Packaging companies of Canada
Manufacturing companies based in Toronto
Manufacturing companies established in 1951
Canadian companies established in 1951